Blue ice, in the context of aviation, is frozen sewage material that has leaked mid-flight from commercial aircraft lavatory waste systems. It is a mixture of human biowaste and liquid disinfectant that freezes at high altitude. The name comes from the blue color of the disinfectant. Airlines are not allowed to dump their waste tanks mid-flight, and pilots have no mechanism by which to do so; however, leaks sometimes do occur from a plane's septic tank.

Danger of ground impact
There were at least 27 documented incidents of blue ice impacts in the United States between 1979 and 2003. These incidents typically happen under airport landing paths as the mass warms sufficiently to detach from the plane during its descent. A rare incident of falling blue ice causing damage to the roof of a home was reported on October 20, 2006 in Chino, California. A similar incident was reported in Leicester, UK, in 2007.

In 1971, a chunk of ice from an aircraft tore a large hole in the roof of the Essex Street Chapel in Kensington, London, and was one trigger for the demolition of the building.

In November 2011, a chunk of ice, the size of an orange, broke through the roof of a private house in Ratingen-Hösel, Germany.

In February 2013, a "football sized" ball of blue ice smashed through a conservatory roof in Clanfield, Hampshire, causing around £10,000 worth of damage.

In October 2016, a chunk of ice tore a hole in a private house in Amstelveen, The Netherlands.

In two incidents in May 2018, chunks of blue ice fell onto residents in Kelowna, British Columbia. 

In November 2018, a chunk of ice fell from the sky and crashed through the roof of a home in Bristol, England.

Danger to aircraft 
Blue ice can also be dangerous to the aircraft itself; the National Transportation Safety Board has recorded three very similar incidents where waste from lavatories caused damage to the leaking aircraft. All involved Boeing 727s, and in all cases waste from a leaking lavatory hit one of the engines, mounted at the rear of the aircraft, causing a power loss.  The flights made safe emergency landings with the two remaining engines. Nobody was injured.
Only one report specifically mentions ice, while another mentions "soft body FOD" (foreign object damage), indicating that the damage was caused by a relatively soft object like ice or a bird and not a metallic object or a stone.

In popular culture
Blue ice became known to many people from the 2003 Season 3 finale of the HBO television series Six Feet Under, in which a foot-sized chunk drops on a woman, killing her. A similar incident occurs in the 1996 television series Early Edition episode “Frostbite”, when the main character saves a man from being crushed by a chunk of blue ice. It was also mentioned in The Big Bang Theory. This also happened in an episode of CSI: NY. The title of the 1992 film Blue Ice is a reference to the phenomenon. The 2001 film Joe Dirt finds the title character (played by David Spade) proudly displaying a large chunk of "blue ice" which he has mistaken for a meteorite, and the topic has also been covered on the TV show MANswers. Blue ice was also featured in  an episode of the television series MythBusters. Blue ice is a cause of death in season 4 of 1000 Ways to Die. Blue ice also features in Series 6 Episode 1 of the BBC Series The Brittas Empire, in which a block of blue ice falls on the Whitbury Newtown Leisure Centre.

See also
Parts Departing Aircraft

References

External links
 
  
 
 

Aircraft operations
Biological waste
Pollution